Trichotheca is a genus of leaf beetles in the subfamily Eumolpinae. It is distributed in South Asia, Southeast Asia and Southern China.

Species

 Trichotheca aeneopicta Bryant, 1924
 Trichotheca annularis Tan, 1981
 Trichotheca apicalis Pic, 1928
 Trichotheca attenuata Tan, 1992
 Trichotheca beesoni Bryant, 1941
 Trichotheca bicolor Tan, 1988
 Trichotheca brunnea (Tan, 1992)
 Trichotheca dentata Tan, 1981
 Trichotheca elongata Tan, 1988
 Trichotheca flavinotata Tan, 1981
 Trichotheca fulvopilosa Chen & Wang, 1976
 Trichotheca fuscicornis Chen, 1963
 Trichotheca hirta Baly, 1860
 Trichotheca nodicollis Chen & Wang, 1976
 Trichotheca nuristanica Medvedev, 1985
 Trichotheca parva Chen & Wang, 1976
 Trichotheca rufofrontalis Tan, 1992
 Trichotheca similis Tan, 1992
 Trichotheca unicolor Chen & Wang, 1976
 Trichotheca variabilis Gressitt & Kimoto, 1961
 Trichotheca ventralis Chen, 1935
 Trichotheca vietnamica Medvedev, 2015

References

Eumolpinae
Chrysomelidae genera
Beetles of Asia
Taxa named by Joseph Sugar Baly